Balneotherapy ( "bath") is a method of treating diseases by bathing, a traditional medicine technique usually practiced at spas. Since ancient times, humans have used hot springs, public baths and thermal medicine for therapeutic effects. While it is considered distinct from hydrotherapy, there are some overlaps in practice and in underlying principles. Balneotherapy may involve hot or cold water, massage through moving water, relaxation, or stimulation. Many mineral waters at spas are rich in particular minerals such as silica, sulfur, selenium, and radium. Medicinal clays are also widely used, a practice known as 'fangotherapy'.

Definition and characteristics

"Balneotherapy" is the practice of immersing a subject in mineral water or mineral-laden mud; it is part of the traditional medicine of many cultures and originated in hot springs, cold water springs, or other sources of such water, like the Dead Sea.

Presumed effect on diseases

Balneotherapy may be recommended for a wide range of illnesses, including arthritis, skin conditions and fibromyalgia. Balneotherapy should be discussed in advance with a physician before beginning treatment, since a number of conditions, like heart disease and pregnancy, can result in a serious adverse effect.

Scientific studies into the effectiveness of balneotherapy do not show that balneotherapy is effective for treating rheumatoid arthritis. There is also no evidence indicating a more effective type of bath,  or to indicate that bathing is more effective than exercise, relaxation therapy, or mudpacks.  Most of the studies on balneotherapy have methodological flaws and are not reliable.  A 2009 review of all published clinical evidence concluded that existing research is not sufficiently strong to draw firm conclusions about the efficacy of balneotherapy.

"Balneophototherapy" combines salt bathing (balneotherapy) and exposure to ultraviolet B-light (UVB) as a potential treatment for severe, chronic plaque psoriasis. A Cochrane review found low-quality evidence that salt bathing combined with UVB may relieve psoriasis severity compared to UVB treatment only.

See also
 Boleslav Vladimirovich Likhterman
 Enoch Heinrich Kisch
 Destination spa
 Hot spring
 Hydrotherapy
 Mineral spa
 Onsen
 Peloid
 Thalassotherapy

References

Further reading
 Nathaniel Altman, Healing springs: the ultimate guide to taking the waters : from hidden springs to the world's greatest spas. Inner Traditions / Bear & Company, 2000. 
 James Crook, The Mineral Waters of the United States and their Theraputic Uses, Lea Brothers & Co., New York and Philadelphia, 1899.
 Dian Dincin Buchman, The complete book of water healing. 2nd ed., McGraw-Hill Professional, 2001. 
 Jane Crebbin-Bailey, John W. Harcup, John Harrington, The Spa Book: The Official Guide to Spa Therapy. Publisher: Cengage Learning EMEA, 2005. 
 
 Esti Dvorjetski, Leisure, pleasure, and healing: spa culture and medicine in ancient eastern Mediterranean., E. J. Brill, 2007 (illustrated). 
 Carola Koenig, Specialized Hydro-, Balneo-and Medicinal Bath Therapy. Publisher: iUniverse, 2005. 
 Anne Williams, Spa bodywork: a guide for massage therapists. Lippincott Williams & Wilkins, 2006. 

 
Bathing
Naturopathy